Claus Kristian Randolph Clausen (December 9, 1869 – December 23, 1958) was an enlisted man and later an officer in the United States Navy. He received America's highest military decoration, the Medal of Honor, for actions in the Spanish–American War.

Biography
Claus Kristian Randolph Clausen was born on December 9, 1869 in Denmark. Later enlisting in the Navy from the state of New York, he served on the  during the Spanish–American War as a Coxswain. He was one of eight volunteer crew members of the collier , which Rear Admiral William T. Sampson ordered sunk to block the entrance of Santiago Harbor, Cuba. On the night of June 2–3, 1898, during the attempt to execute this mission, Merrimacs steering gear was disabled by enemy gunfire, and she sank without obstructing navigation. Her crewmen were rescued by the Spanish and made prisoners-of-war. After the Battle of Santiago de Cuba destroyed the Spanish fleet a month later, Clausen and his shipmates were released. For his "extraordinary heroism" during this operation, he was awarded the Medal of Honor.

Clausen was promoted to the Warrant Officer rank of Boatswain on July 30, 1903. As an officer, his initial assignment was on the cruiser , operating in the Caribbean. Following this sea duty, he served two years on the New York Navy Yard's receiving ship . Boatswain Clausen's next time at sea was on the battleship  from 1908 to 1911. On July 30, 1909, while on Mississippi, he was promoted to Chief Boatswain. After another tour at the New York Navy Yard, from 1911 to 1914, Chief Boatswain Clausen obtained the special qualification of a "Master's License under Steamboat-Inspection Service" before reporting on board battleship . He served in her during World War I and received a temporary promotions to Lieutenant, Junior Grade in May 1917 and Lieutenant on July 1, 1918.

After the war, Clausen transferred back to the New York Navy Yard and, in 1920, reverted to his permanent rank of Chief Boatswain. In November 1922, he transferred to the Naval Torpedo Station, Newport, Rhode Island and three months later reported on board the receiving ship  at New York. Chief Boatswain Clausen was placed on the retired list on November 15, 1925. Though retired, he was promoted to Lieutenant in June 1930, but again reverted to Chief Warrant Officer 4 in the early 1950s. He lived his later years in Massapequa Park, New York, and at his death was the last surviving Medal of Honor recipient from the USS Merrimac mission of the Spanish–American War. Claus K. R. Clausen died on December 23, 1958 at St. Albans, New York and is interred in the U.S. Columbarium, Middle Village, New York.

Medal of Honor citation
Rank and organization: Coxswain, U.S. Navy. Born: December 9, 1869, Denmark. Accredited to: New York. G.O. No.: 529, November 2, 1899.

Citation:

In connection with the sinking of the U.S.S. Merrimac at the entrance to the harbor of Santiago de Cuba, 2 June 1898. Despite heavy fire from the Spanish batteries, Clausen displayed extraordinary heroism throughout this operation.

See also

 List of Medal of Honor recipients for the Spanish–American War

References
 

1869 births
1958 deaths
United States Navy Medal of Honor recipients
Spanish–American War prisoners of war held by Spain
American military personnel of the Spanish–American War
United States Navy officers
People from Queens, New York
Foreign-born Medal of Honor recipients
Danish emigrants to the United States
Spanish–American War recipients of the Medal of Honor
People from Massapequa Park, New York
United States Navy personnel of World War I